More Than a Dream may refer to:

 "More Than a Dream", a song by the Christian pop group Raze
 More than a Dream: How One School's Vision Is Changing the World, a 2008 book about Cristo Rey Jesuit High School
 "More Than a Dream", a song by the Pet Shop Boys on their album Yes
 More Than a Dream, an album by Harrison Craig and its title track
 "More Than a Dream", a song by Bill Wurtz